A Place to Be Loved is a 1993 American television film with Richard Crenna and Rhea Perlman. It was released in the United Kingdom under the title Shattered Family.

Plot summary
Gregory Kingsley is a boy who is abused by his father and placed with social services by his mother. The foster family he is put into proves to be the type of nurturing environment he needs. He ends up taking his mother to court, to have her parental rights revoked, in hopes of being adopted by his foster family. The story is based on a real life case of child abuse.

Cast
 Richard Crenna as George Russ
 Tom Guiry as Gregory Kingsley
 David Lipper as Robert Russ

External links

1993 television films
1993 films
1990s biographical drama films
1990s legal films
American biographical drama films
American legal drama films
American courtroom films
Films about adoption
Films about child abuse
Films about dysfunctional families
American drama television films
1990s English-language films
1990s American films